Beta Pictoris c (abbreviated as β Pic c) is the second exoplanet discovered orbiting the young star Beta Pictoris, located approximately 63 light-years away from Earth in the constellation of Pictor. Its mass is around nine times that  of Jupiter, and it orbits at around 2.7 astronomical units (AU) from Beta Pictoris, about 3.5 times closer to its parent star than Beta Pictoris b. The orbit of Beta Pictoris c is moderately eccentric, with an eccentricity of 0.24.

This exoplanet is notable for having been detected by three different methods: initially radial velocity, then direct imaging and astrometry.

Physical characteristics

Mass and radius
Beta Pictoris c is a super-Jupiter, an exoplanet that has a radius and mass greater than that of the planet Jupiter. It has a mass of around 10 Jupiter masses and an estimated radius of about 1.12 times that of Jupiter.

Host star 

The planet orbits an A-type main sequence star named Beta Pictoris. The star has a mass of 1.75 solar masses and a radius of 1.8 solar radii. It has a surface temperature of 8056 K and is only 12 million years old. It is slightly metal-rich, with a metallicity (Fe/H) of 0.06, or 112% of that found in the Sun. Its luminosity is 8.7 times that of the Sun.

Orbit

Discovery 
Beta Pictoris c was detected indirectly, through 10 years of observation of radial velocity data from the High Accuracy Radial Velocity Planet Searcher (HARPS) spectroscope on the European Southern Observatory's ESO 3.6 m Telescope at La Silla Observatory in Chile by a worldwide team led by Anne-Marie Lagrange, as the discovery of the planet was publicly announced in August 2019. This discovery was described as being able to help scientists further understand the formation of planetary systems and their evolution in the early stages. In October 2020, new images of the exoplanet were revealed.

The European Southern Observatory confirmed the presence of Beta Pictoris c, on 6 October 2020, through the use of optical interferometry. With a semi-major axis of approximatively 2.7 astronomical units, Beta Pictoris c is, as of 2020, the closest extrasolar planet to its star ever photographed.

As of 2022, the orbital parameters and mass of Beta Pictoris c have been measured using a combination of data from radial velocity, astrometry, and imaging, showing that it is about 10.1 times the mass of Jupiter, on an eccentric orbit (eccentricity 0.31) with a semi-major axis of about 2.7 AU and an orbital period of about 3.3 years.

References 

Exoplanets detected by radial velocity
Exoplanets detected by direct imaging
Exoplanets detected by astrometry
Exoplanets discovered in 2019
Giant planets
Pictor (constellation)